Charles J. Power (born 29 February 1948 in Tors Cove, Newfoundland and Labrador) was a member of the House of Commons of Canada from 1997 to 2000. By career, he was a teacher.

From the 1975 to 1992 he was a Member of the Newfoundland and Labrador House of Assembly for Ferryland.

Charlie Power won the St. John's West electoral district for the Progressive Conservative party during the 1997 general election. He resigned his House of Commons seat on 31 January 2000 before the end of the 36th Canadian Parliament ostensibly for personal reasons.

External links
 
CBC News: "Tories try to heal rift over clarity bill", 25 January 2000, accessed 21 July 2006

   

1948 births
Living people
Members of the House of Commons of Canada from Newfoundland and Labrador
Progressive Conservative Party of Canada MPs